The Armed Forces of the Islamic Emirate of Afghanistan, also referred to as the Islamic Emirate Armed Forces and the Afghan Armed Forces, is the military of Afghanistan, ruled by the Taliban government from 1996 to 2001 and since August 2021. The Taliban created the first iteration of the emirate's armed forces in 1997 after taking over Afghanistan following the end of the Afghan Civil War which raged between 1992 and 1996. However, the first iteration of the armed forces was dissolved in 2001 after the downfall of the first Taliban government following the United States invasion of Afghanistan. It was officially reestablished on November 8, 2021 after the Taliban's victory in the War in Afghanistan on August 15, 2021 following the recapture of Kabul and the collapse of the U.S.-backed Islamic Republic of Afghanistan and its Afghan National Army as a whole, with the re-establishment of the Islamic Emirate of Afghanistan after being out of power for 20 years.

History of the Armed Forces 

In April 1978 there was a coup, known as the Saur Revolution, orchestrated by members of the government loyal to the People's Democratic Party of Afghanistan (PDPA). This led to a full-scale Soviet invasion in December 1979, led by the 40th Army and the Airborne Forces. In 1981 the total strength of the Afghan Armed Forces was around 85,000 troops according to The New York Times. The Afghan Army had around 35–40,000 soldiers, mostly conscripts; the Air Force had around 7,000 personnel; and the total of all military personnel was around 87,000 in 1984. Throughout the 1980s, the Afghan Armed Forces was heavily involved in fighting against the multi-national mujahideen rebel groups who were largely backed by the United States and trained by the Pakistan Armed Forces. The rebel groups were fighting to force the Soviet Union to withdraw from Afghanistan as well as to remove the Soviet-backed government of President Mohammad Najibullah. Due to large number of defectors, the Afghan Armed Forces in 1985 were reduced to no more than about 47,000, the actual figure probably being lower.  The Air Force had over 150 combat aircraft with about 7,000 officers who were supported by up to 5,000 Cuban Revolutionary Air and Air Defense Force and Czechoslovak Air Force advisers.

Under the Democratic Republic of Afghanistan (1978–1992), weapon deliveries by the Soviets were increased and included Mi-24 helicopters, MiG-23 fighter aircraft, ZSU-23-4 "Shilka" and ZSU-57-2 anti-aircraft self-propelled mounts, MT-LB armored personnel carriers, BM-27 "Uragan" and BM-21 "Grad" multiple-launch rocket systems and FROG-7 and Scud launchers. Some of the weapons that were not damaged during the decades of wars are still being used today.

Weapons supplies were made available to the mujahideen rebel groups through numerous countries; the United States purchased all of Israel's captured Soviet weapons clandestinely, and then funnelled the weapons to the mujahideen rebels, while Egypt upgraded their own Army's weapons, and sent the older weapons to the mujahideen, Turkey sold its World War II stockpiles, and the British and Swiss provided Blowpipe missiles and Oerlikon anti-aircraft guns respectively, after they were found to be poor models for their own forces. China provided the most relevant weapons, likely due to their own experience with guerrilla warfare, and kept meticulous record of all the shipments.

Following the Soviet withdrawal in 1989 the mujahideen rebel attacks continued and grew in intensity. For several years the Afghan Armed Forces had actually increased their effectiveness past levels ever achieved during the Soviet military presence. The eleven-year Siege of Khost ended with the city's fall in March 1991. But the government was dealt a major blow when Abdul Rashid Dostum, a leading general, switched allegiances to the mujahideen forces in 1992 and together they captured the city of Kabul. 

By 1992 the Afghan Army fragmented into regional militias under local warlords because of the fall of the Soviet Union which stopped supplying the Afghan Armed Forces and later in 1992 when the Democratic Republic of Afghanistan government lost power.

After the fall of Mohammad Najibullah's regime in 1992, the various Afghan political parties began to assemble their own more formal armed forces. By February 1992 Massoud's Jamiat-i-Islami had a central force reported at six battalions strong, plus additional second tier units, "the bulk of the army, ..made up of regional battalions, subordinate to local commanders of the Supervisory Council." On 16 January 1993 Jane's Defence Weekly reported that "a special assembly of 1335 delegates elected from across Afghanistan" had both elected Professor Burhanuddin Rabbani as President of the Islamic State of Afghanistan for two years, and agreed to "establish a regular army with soldiers mostly drawn from Mojahedin groups." Pakistan had offered training assistance. However, a Civil War started between the various warlords, including Ahmad Shah Massoud, Gulbuddin Hekmatyar, Abdul Rashid Dostum, Abdul Ali Mazari, Jalaluddin Haqqani, Ismail Khan, Atta Muhammad Nur, Abdul Rasul Sayyaf, Mohammad Nabi Mohammadi, Mohammad Yunus Khalis, Gul Agha Sherzai and many others. 

The Taliban movement arose around Kandahar in southern Afghanistan and defeated the various armed movements there that had squabbled since the dissolution of the previous Afghan Army and Afghan Air Force. They moved to confront Ahmed Shah Massoud's forces by marching to the gates of Kabul in March 1995.

During the 1990s the Taliban maintained 400 T-54/55 and T-62 tanks and more than 200 armoured personnel carriers.  The Taliban also began training its own army and commanders. After the removal of the Taliban government in late 2001, private armies loyal to warlords gained more and more influence. In mid-2001, Ali Jalali wrote:

During the 1990s the Taliban's air force had five supersonic MiG-21MFs and 10 Sukhoi-22 fighter-bombers. They also had six Mil Mi-8 helicopters, five Mi-35s, five L-39Cs, six An-12s, 25 An-26s, a dozen An-24 and An-32s, an IL-18, and a Yakovlev. Their civil air service contained two Boeing 727A/Bs, a Tu-154, five An-24s, and a DHC-6.

On 3 August 1995, Taliban Mikoyan-Gurevich MiG-21 fighters forced a Russian Ilyushin-76 cargo plane carrying arms from Albania to Afghanistan to land at Kandahar.  Negotiations between the Russian government and the Taliban to free the men stalled for over a year and efforts by American senator Hank Brown to mediate between the two parties broke down over a prisoner exchange. Brown was able to get the Taliban to agree that the Russian crew should be allowed to maintain their aircraft. This request paved the way for their escape.

Branches

Army 

The army under the Taliban Islamic Movement was inaugurated on November 8, 2021 as the Army of the Islamic Emirate of Afghanistan, which is also referred to as the Islamic Emirate Army and the Afghan Army. To date, the army itself relies heavily on captured hardware from the defeated Afghan National Army. Approximately 2,000 vehicles fell into Taliban hands after the Fall of Kabul, including the Humvee, M1117 Guardian, MaxxPro MRAP and Oshkosh ATV. In terms of infantry equipment, captured items include the M4 carbine, M16 rifle, night-vision goggles, body armor suits, communication equipment and shoulder-mounted grenade launchers. These U.S. made firearms are reportedly replacing Russian made AK-47s and AK-74s carried by most Taliban fighters.

From 1 September 2021 to 10 January 2022, 15,102 newly trained fighters were inducted into the Islamic Emirate Army as calculated on the official site, the average number of new soldiers inducted is 120 soldiers per week not counting paramilitaries.

Formation and structure
Currently the conventional land forces of the Islamic Emirate Army are subdivided into eight corps, mostly superseding the previous corps of the former Afghan National Army. The conventional land warfare corps of the Islamic Emirate Army were renamed in November 2021 by Mullah Yaqoob, Acting Minister of Defense. They are listed below.

All the corps beyond Kabul can be definitively tied to previous Afghan National Army (ANA) formations. However the number '313' was not utilized by the ANA, in Kabul or beyond, and the only former Taliban unit with that number was the Badri 313 Battalion. Other reported units include the Victorious Force Unit and the Panipat unit.

The Badri 313 Battalion, the Red Unit, and the "Yarmouk 60 Special Forces Battalion" may have some special forces capabilities.

Air Force 

The Taliban created and ran a small air force in from 1996 to 2001. After the re-establishment of the Islamic Emirate of Afghanistan and the fall of Kabul during the 2021 Taliban offensive, the Taliban established the Air Force of the Islamic Emirate of Afghanistan, which is also referred to as the Islamic Emirate Air Force and the Afghan Air Force. The air force acquired UH-60 Black Hawks, Mil Mi-24s (most of them without engines), Mil Mi-8s/Mil Mi-17s, A-29 Super Tucanos, Cessna 208s, and C-130 Hercules.

On 11 January 2022, the air force successfully repaired and flew unserviceable aircraft which were abandoned by the US Army and the former Afghan National Army after Kabul fell to the Taliban. A new Taliban commander of the Afghan Air Force spoke as part of the announcement.

Conscription 

According to the testimony of Guantanamo detainees before their Combatant Status Review Tribunals, the Taliban, in addition to conscripting men to serve as soldiers, also conscripted men to staff its civil service.

Conscription of children 

According to a report from the University of Oxford, the Taliban made widespread use of the conscription of children in 1997, 1998 and 1999. During the civil war that preceded the Taliban regime, thousands of orphaned boys joined various militia for "employment, food, shelter, protection and economic opportunity." The report said that during its initial period the Taliban "long depended upon cohorts of youth". Witnesses stated that each land-owning family had to provide one young man and $500 in expenses. In August, of that year 5000 students aged between 15 and 35 left madrassas in Pakistan to join the Taliban.

See also 
 List of equipment of the Afghan Armed Forces
 History of the Afghan Armed Forces (2002–2021)

Notes

References 

 

 
 

 

Military of Afghanistan
Islamic Emirate Forces
1997 establishments in Afghanistan
2001 disestablishments in Afghanistan
2021 establishments in Afghanistan

Military units and formations established in 1997
Military units and formations disestablished in 2001
Military units and formations established in 2021